Ronald Hurst (born May 18, 1931) is a Canadian former professional ice hockey player who played 64 games in the National Hockey League with the Toronto Maple Leafs during the 1955–56 and 1956–57 seasons. The rest of his career, which lasted from 1951 to 1960, was spent in various minor leagues.

Career statistics

Regular season and playoffs

External links
 

1931 births
Living people
Canadian ice hockey right wingers
Hershey Bears players
Pittsburgh Hornets players
Rochester Americans players
Ice hockey people from Toronto
Toronto Maple Leafs players
Toronto Marlboros players
Toronto Young Rangers players